Jean-François Dubessay (1 April 1921 – 15 February 2005) was a French field hockey player who competed in the 1948 Summer Olympics and in the 1952 Summer Olympics.

References

External links
 

1921 births
2005 deaths
French male field hockey players
Olympic field hockey players of France
Field hockey players at the 1948 Summer Olympics
Field hockey players at the 1952 Summer Olympics